A polder  is a low-lying tract of land that forms an artificial hydrological entity, enclosed by embankments known as dikes. The three types of polder are:

 Land reclaimed from a body of water, such as a lake or the seabed
 Flood plains separated from the sea or river by a dike
 Marshes separated from the surrounding water by a dike and subsequently drained; these are also known as koogs, especially in Germany

The ground level in drained marshes subsides over time. All polders will eventually be below the surrounding water level some or all of the time. Water enters the low-lying polder through infiltration and water pressure of groundwater, or rainfall, or transport of water by rivers and canals. This usually means that the polder has an excess of water, which is pumped out or drained by opening sluices at low tide. Care must be taken not to set the internal water level too low. Polder land made up of peat (former marshland) will sink in relation to its previous level, because of peat decomposing when exposed to oxygen from the air. 
 
Polders are at risk from flooding at all times, and care must be taken to protect the surrounding dikes. Dikes are typically built with locally available materials, and each material has its own risks: sand is prone to collapse owing to saturation by water; dry peat is lighter than water and potentially unable to retain water in very dry seasons. Some animals dig tunnels in the barrier, allowing water to infiltrate the structure; the muskrat is known for this activity and hunted in certain European countries because of it. Polders are most commonly, though not exclusively, found in river deltas, former fenlands, and coastal areas.

Flooding of polders has also been used as a military tactic in the past. One example is the flooding of the polders along the Yser River during World War I. Opening the sluices at high tide and closing them at low tide turned the polders into an inaccessible swamp, which allowed the Allied armies to stop the German army.

Netherlands has a large area of polders: as much as 20% of the land area has at some point in the past been reclaimed from the sea, thus contributing to the development of the country. IJsselmeer is the most famous polder project of the Netherlands. Some other countries which have polders are Bangladesh, Belgium, Canada and China. Some examples of Dutch polder projects are Beemster, Schermer, Flevopolder and Noordoostpolder.

Etymology
The Dutch word polder derives successively from Middle Dutch polre, from Old Dutch polra, and ultimately from pol-, a piece of land elevated above its surroundings, with the augmentative suffix -er and epenthetical  -d-. The word has been adopted in thirty-six languages.

Netherlands

The Netherlands is frequently associated with polders, as its engineers became noted for developing techniques to drain wetlands and make them usable for agriculture and other development. This is illustrated by the saying "God created the world, but the Dutch created the Netherlands".

The Dutch have a long history of reclamation of marshes and fenland, resulting in some 3,000 polders nationwide. By 1961, about half of the country's land, was reclaimed from the sea. About half the total surface area of polders in north-west Europe is in the Netherlands. The first embankments in Europe were constructed in Roman times. The first polders were constructed in the 11th century. The oldest extant polder is the Achtermeer polder, from 1533.

As a result of flooding disasters, water boards called waterschap (when situated more inland) or hoogheemraadschap (near the sea, mainly used in the Holland region) were set up to maintain the integrity of the water defences around polders, maintain the waterways inside a polder, and control the various water levels inside and outside the polder. Water boards hold separate elections, levy taxes, and function independently from other government bodies. Their function is basically unchanged even today. As such, they are the oldest democratic institutions in the country. The necessary cooperation among all ranks to maintain polder integrity gave its name to the Dutch version of third-way politics—the Polder Model.

The 1953 flood disaster prompted a new approach to the design of dikes and other water-retaining structures, based on an acceptable probability of overflowing. Risk is defined as the product of probability and consequences. The potential damage in lives, property, and rebuilding costs is compared with the potential cost of water defences. From these calculations follows an acceptable flood risk from the sea at one in 4,000–10,000 years, while it is one in 100–2,500 years for a river flood. The particular established policy guides the Dutch government to improve flood defences as new data on threat levels become available.

Major Dutch polders and the years they were laid dry include Beemster (1609–1612), Schermer (1633–1635), and Haarlemmermeerpolder (1852). Polders created as part of the Zuiderzee Works include Wieringermeerpolder (1930), Noordoostpolder (1942) and Flevopolder (1956–1968)

Examples of polders

Brazil
Several cities on the Paraíba Valley region (in the São Paulo (state)) have polders on land claimed from the floodplains around the Paraíba do Sul river.

Bangladesh
Bangladesh has 139 polders, of which 49 are sea-facing, while the rest are along the numerous distributaries of the Ganges-Brahmaputra-Meghna River delta. These were constructed in the 1960s to protect the coast from tidal flooding and reduce salinity incursion. They reduce long-term flooding and waterlogging following storm surges from tropical cyclones. They are also cultivated for agriculture.

Belgium

 De Moeren, near Veurne in West Flanders
 Polders along the Yser river between Nieuwpoort and Diksmuide
 Polders of Muisbroek and Ettenhoven, in Ekeren and Hoevenen
 Polder of Stabroek, in Stabroek
 Kabeljauwpolder, in Zandvliet
 Scheldepolders on the left bank of the Scheldt
 Uitkerkse polders, near Blankenberge in West Flanders
 Prosperpolder, near Doel, Antwerp and Kieldrecht.

Canada
 Tantramar Marshes
 Holland Marsh
 Pitt Polder Ecological Reserve
 Grand Pré, Nova Scotia
 Minas Basin

China 

 The city of Kunshan has over 100 polders.

History
The Jiangnan region, at the Yangtze River Delta, has a long history of constructing polders. Most of these projects were performed between the 10th and 13th centuries. The Chinese government also assisted local communities in constructing dikes for swampland water drainage. The Lijia (里甲) self-monitoring system  of 110 households under a lizhang (里长) headman was used for the purposes of service administration and tax collection in the polder, with a liangzhang (粮长, grain chief) responsible for maintaining the water system and a tangzhang (塘长, dike chief）for polder maintenance.

Denmark
 Filsø
 Lammefjorden

Finland
 Söderfjärden
 Munsmo
 Two polders ( in total) near Vassor in Korsholm

France
 Marais Poitevin
 Les Moëres, adjacent to the Flemish polder De Moeren in Belgium.

Germany

In Germany, land reclaimed by diking is called a koog. The German Deichgraf system was similar to the Dutch and is widely known from Theodor Storm's novella The Rider on the White Horse.

 Altes Land near Hamburg
 Blockland and Hollerland near Bremen
 Nordstrand, Germany
 Bormerkoog and Meggerkoog near Friedrichstadt
 36 koogs in the district of Nordfriesland
 12 koogs in the district of Dithmarschen

In southern Germany, the term polder is used for retention basins recreated by opening dikes during river floodplain restoration, a meaning somewhat opposite to that in coastal context.

Guyana
 Black Bush Polder, Corentyne, Berbice.

India
 Kuttanad Region, Kerala

Ireland
 Lough Swilly, Co. Donegal. Near Inch Island and Newtowncunningham.

Italy
 Delta of the river Po, such as Bonifica Valle del Mezzano

Japan 

 Around the Ariake Sea in Kyushu, mainly in Saga but also in Fukuoka and Kumamoto Prefectures

Lithuania
 Rusnė Island

Netherlands

 Achtermeer, the oldest polder, from 1533
 Alblasserwaard, containing the windmills of Kinderdijk, a World Heritage Site
 Alkmaar
 Andijk
 Anna Paulownapolder
 Beemster, a World Heritage Site
 Bijlmermeer
 Flevopolder, the largest artificial island in the world, youngest polder, last part drained in 1968
 's-Gravesloot
 Haarlemmermeer, containing Schiphol airport
 Krimpenerwaard
 Lauwersmeer
 Mastenbroek
 Noordoostpolder
 Prins Alexanderpolder
 Purmer
 Schermer
 Watergraafsmeer
 Wieringermeer
 Wieringerwaard
 Wijdewormer
 Zestienhoven, home of the Rotterdam The Hague Airport (Overschie), in the city of Rotterdam.
 Zuidplaspolder, along with Lammefjord in Denmark the lowest point of the European Union

Poland
 Vistula delta near Elbląg and Nowy Dwór Gdański
 Warta delta near Kostrzyn nad Odrą

Singapore
 Parts of Pulau Tekong

Slovenia
 The Ankaran/Ancarano Polder, Semedela Polder, and Škocjan Polder in reclaimed land around Koper/Capodistria.

South Korea
 Parts of the coast of Ganghwa Island, adjacent to the river Han in Incheon
 Delta of the river Nakdong in Busan
 Saemangeum in North Jeolla Province

Spain
 Parts of Málaga were built on reclaimed land

United Kingdom
 Traeth Mawr
 Sunk Island, on the north shore of the Humber east of Hull
Caldicot and Wentloog Levels along the Severn Estuary in South Wales
 Parts of The Fens
Branston Island, by the River Witham outside the conventional area of the fens but connected to them.
 Parts of the coast of Essex
 Some land along the River Plym in Plymouth
 Some land around Meathop east of Grange-over-Sands, reclaimed as a side-effect of building a railway embankment
 The Somerset Levels and North Somerset Levels
 Romney Marsh
 Sealand, Flintshire
 Humberhead Levels

United States
 New Orleans
 Sacramento – San Joaquin River Delta

See also 
Afsluitdijk
Flood control in the Netherlands
Land reclamation
Windpump

References

Further reading
 Derex, Jean-Michel, Franco Cazzola (eds.) 2004. 2nd ed. 2013. Eau et développement dans l'Europe moderne. Paris, Maison des Sciences De L'Homme
 Farjon, J.M.J., J. Dirkx, A. Koomen, J. Vervloet & W. Lammers. 2001. Neder-landschap Internationaal: bouwstenen voor een selectie van gebieden landschapsbehoud. Alterra, Wageningen. Rapport 358.
 Stenak, Morten. 2005. De inddæmmede Landskaber – En historisk geografi. Landbohistorik Selskab.
 Polders of the World. Keynotes International Symposium. 1982. Lelystad, The Netherlands
 Ven, G.P. van de (ed.) 1993, 4th ed. 2004. Man-made Lowlands. History of Water Management and Land Reclamation in the Netherlands, Matrijs, Utrecht.
 Wagret, Paul. 1972. Polderlands. London: Methuen.

External links

 Polder landscapes in the Netherlands – in a northwest European and a landmark context.
 How to make a polder – online film

 
Artificial landforms
Land reclamation
Environmental soil science
Riparian zone
Coastal construction
Freshwater ecology